João Vieira (born 6 March 1919) was a Portuguese athlete. He competed in the men's triple jump at the 1948 Summer Olympics.

References

External links
 

1919 births
Possibly living people
Athletes (track and field) at the 1948 Summer Olympics
Portuguese male triple jumpers
Olympic athletes of Portugal